Thomas Brown House may refer to:

Thomas Brown House (Franklin, Tennessee)
Thomas Brown House (Inwood, West Virginia)
Col. Thomas Brown House, Preston County, West Virginia

See also
Brown House (disambiguation)